Chukwudi Chukwuma (born 27 May 1994) is a Nigerian professional footballer who plays as a forward for FK Pelister in the Macedonian First Football League.

Career

Early career
Born in Nigeria, Chukwuma moved to India in 2006 at the age of 11, and schooled at the Don Bosco High School in Panaji, Goa where he played school football until 2010. In 2010, he jointed the Sesa Football Academy in Goa, after his father, Clifford Chukwuma was appointed as the clubs' head coach. Eventually making it to the first-team at the Sesa, he played in the I-League 2nd Division and Goa Professional League for his side.

FK Teplice
In November 2013, Chukwuma went on trial with Czech First League side FK Teplice where he impressed coaches, scoring a goal in a friendly match against FK Meteor Prague VIII. He signed a four-year deal with FK Teplice in December 2013. and made his professional debut with the club on 2 March 2014 against Sigma Olomouc, coming on as a 79th-minute substitute for Admir Ljevaković, as Teplice won 4–0.

Chukwuma scored his first goal for the club on 30 September 2014 against TJ Jiskra Domažlice in the Czech Cup. His goal in the 70th minute was the third in a 4–0 victory.

On 30 September 2016 it was confirmed that Chukwuma had left Teplice due to heath issues.

FK Varnsdorf (loan)
In September 2015, Chukwuma was loaned to FK Varnsdorf of the Czech 2. Liga. He made his debut on 13 September 2015 against Táborsko. He played 58 minutes before being substituted off for David Špaček as Vansdorf lost 1–3.

Career statistics

Personal life
Chukwudi's father Clifford Chukwuma is a former semi-professional footballer, who played in the late 1980s in the Nigerian Premier League, and has worked in India for the Sesa Football Academy and for I-League club Sporting Clube de Goa.

References

External links 
 
 FK Teplice Profile.

1994 births
Living people
Nigerian footballers
Nigerian expatriate footballers
Czech First League players
Czech National Football League players
FK Teplice players
FK Varnsdorf players
Association football forwards
I-League 2nd Division players
FK Pelister players
Expatriate footballers in North Macedonia
Expatriate footballers in India
Expatriate footballers in the Czech Republic
Nigerian expatriate sportspeople in India
Nigerian expatriate sportspeople in the Czech Republic
Don Bosco schools alumni
Sportspeople from Benin City